General Macdonald or MacDonald may refer to:

Alastair Macdonald (British Army officer) (fl. 1850s–1880s), British Army major general
Arthur MacDonald (1919–1995), Australian Army general
Donald Alexander Macdonald (general) (1845–1920), Canadian Militia major general
Étienne Macdonald (1765–1840), French Army general
George Macdonald (Canadian general) (born c. 1950), Royal Canadian Air Force lieutenant general
Godfrey Macdonald, 3rd Baron Macdonald (1775–1832), British Army lieutenant general
Hector MacDonald (1853–1903), British Army major general
John Macdonald (British Army officer, born 1907) (1907–1979), British Army major general
John Macdonald (British Army officer, died 1850) (before 1795–1850), British Army lieutenant general

See also
Bruce Alexander McDonald (1925–1993), Australian Army major general
Charles C. McDonald (1933–2017), U.S. Air Force general
John Bacon McDonald (1859–1927), U.S. Army brigadier general
Attorney General Macdonald (disambiguation)